Zilchogyra paulistana is a species of  air-breathing land snail, a terrestrial pulmonate gastropod mollusk in the family Helicodiscidae.

Distribution 
This species is endemic to Brazil.

References 

Helicodiscidae
Endemic fauna of Brazil
Gastropods described in 1973
Taxonomy articles created by Polbot